The year 1904 was marked, in science fiction, by the following events.

Births and deaths

Births

Deaths

Events

Awards 
The main science-fiction Awards known at the present time did not exist at this time.

Literary releases

Novels 
 Master of the World (in French : La Maître du monde), novel by Jules Verne.

Stories collections

Short stories

Comics

Audiovisual outputs

Movies 
 The Impossible Voyage (in French : Le Voyage à travers l'impossible), by par Georges Méliès.

See also 
 1904 in science
 1903 in science fiction
 1905 in science fiction

References

science-fiction
Science fiction by year